Telo is a  Celtic god, the eponymous spirit of Toulon in the Var. He was the deity of the sacred spring around which the ancient settlement sprang up. A series of dedications to Telo come from Périgueux: on three of these Telo is invoked with another deities: the goddesses Sianna (in 3 inscriptions) and Vesunna (in one inscription).
The etymology of the deities Telo and Sianna is closely related to the Roman Apollo and Diana.

References 

Gaulish gods
Sea and river gods
Tutelary deities
Toulon